Kent is an unincorporated community in Nassau County, Florida, United States. It is located on State Road 2, in the southwestern part of the county.

Geography
Kent is located at  (30.5214, -81.9667).

References

Unincorporated communities in Nassau County, Florida
Unincorporated communities in the Jacksonville metropolitan area
Unincorporated communities in Florida